Are You with It? is an American musical with music by Harry Revel and lyrics by Arnold B. Horwitt. The musical book by Sam Perrin and George Balzer is based on the novel Slightly Perfect by George Malcolm-Smith. The production opened on Broadway at the New Century Theatre where it ran from November 10, 1945, through April 27, 1946. The show then moved to the Shubert Theatre where it played from April 30 through June 29, 1946, closing after a total of 264 performances.

Productions
The show was directed by Edward Reveaux, musically staged by Jack Donohue, set and lighting design by George Jenkins, costume design by Willa Kim based on costume sketches by Raoul Pene Du Bois, musical directed by William C. K. Irwin, vocal arrangements by H. Clay Warnick, with orchestrations by Joe Glover, Hans Spialek, Ted Royal, Don Walker, and Walter Paul.

Opening night cast

 Johnny Downs as Wilbur Haskins
 Lew Parker as "Goldie"
 Jane Dulo as Marge Keller
 Dolores Gray as Bunny de Fleur
 Joan Roberts as Vivian Reilly
 Diane Adrian as Sally Swivelhips
 Sydney Boyd as Mr. Bixby
 Bunny Briggs as Cicero
 Jane Deering as Snake Charmer's Daughter
 Lou Hurst as 1st Musician
 David Lambert as 2nd Musician
 Jerry Duane as 3rd Musician
 Jerry Packer as 4th Musician
 Lew Eckels as Carter
 Hal Hunter as Office Boy
 Mildred Jocelyn as Balloon Seller
 William Lundy as Strong Man
 Duke McHale as Policeman
 Buster Shaver as Georgetta
 George Shaver as George
 Olive Shaver as Olive
 Richard Shaver as Richard
 Johnny Stearns as Mr. Mapleton / A Barker
 Loren Welch as Loren
 Lou Wills, Jr. as Bartender
 June Richmond as Cleo
 Jimmy Allen, Dorothy Bennett, Vivian Cook, Dorothy Drew, Cece Eames, Suzanne Graves, Beth Green, Penny Holt, Gretchen Houser, Bill Julian, Jo Ann Kavanagh, John Laverty, Charlotte Lorraine, Pat Marlowe, John Martin, Don Miraglia, June Morrison, Tommy Morton, Kay Popp, Renee Russell, George Thornton, Eddie Vale, Bette Valentine, and Doris York as Ensemble

Musical numbers

Act I
 "Five More Minutes in Bed" - Marge and Ensemble
 "Slightly Perfect" - Vivian and Wilbur
 "When a Good Man Takes to Drink" - Vivian and Policeman
 "When a Good Man Takes to Drink" (reprise) - Vivian, Policeman, and Bartender
 "Poor Little Me" - Cleo
 "Are You with It?" - Bunny, Quartet, and Ensemble
 "This Is My Beloved" - Vivian and Wilbur
 "Slightly Slightly" - Olive, George, and Richard
 "Vivian's Reverie" - Orchestra

Act II
 "Send Us Back to the Kitchen" - Marge and Girls
 "Here I Go Again" - Vivian and Quartet
 "You Gotta Keep Saying No" - Bunny
 "Just Beyond the Rainbows" - Cleo and Ensemble
 "In Our Cozy Little Cottage of Tomorrow" - Bunny and Goldie
 Finale - Entire company

References

1945 musicals
Broadway musicals
Musicals based on novels